Community Christian Academy is a private Christian school located in Stuart, Florida. The school offers classes up to 12th grade. There are classes for the kindergarten learners as well. 

The schools offers fine arts, FHSAA athletics and other college preparatory programs.

The school has been operating since 1979.

External links
Official website

Christian schools in Florida
Private schools in Florida
Schools in Martin County, Florida